The Park Scholarships program is an undergraduate scholarship program in the United States. The mission of the program is "to bring exceptional students to North Carolina State University based on outstanding accomplishments and potential in scholarship, leadership, service, and character." The program develops Park Scholars in these four tenets to prepare them for lifelong contributions to the campus, state, nation, and world.

The Park Scholarships program is named for the late Roy H. Park ’31, an NC State alumnus who endowed the Park Foundation, dedicated to education, media, and the environment. With a grant from the Park Foundation, the Park Scholarships program was established in 1996 "to provide a superb educational opportunity for exceptionally talented and well-prepared young men and women who merit the intellectual challenge of a distinguished faculty and a superior university." 

Approximately 40 scholarships are awarded each year to high school seniors for undergraduate study in any discipline at NC State. To be considered for the Park Scholarships program, entering freshmen must apply early admission for NC State by November 1. They must also submit an application to the Park Scholarships program.

History

References

Scholarships in the United States
North Carolina State University